Anastasiya is a feminine given name. Notable people with that name include the following:

Sports

Athletics
Anastasiya Ilyina (born 1982), Russian triple jumper and long jumper
Anastasiya Juravleva (born 1981), Uzbekistani triple jumper and long jumper
Anastasiya Kapachinskaya (born 1979), Russian sprinter
Anastasiya Mokhnyuk (born 1991), Ukrainian heptathlon athlete
Anastasiya Ott (born 1988), Russian hurdling athlete
Anastasiya Rabchenyuk (born 1983), Ukrainian hurdling athlete
Anastasiya Shvedova (born 1979 ), Belarusian pole vaulter
Anastasiya Svechnikova (born 1992), Uzbekistani javelin thrower
Anastasiya Taranova-Potapova (born 1985), Russian triple jumper
Anastasiya Tkachuk (born 1993), Ukrainian middle-distance runner
Anastasiya Zubova (born 1979), Russian long-distance runner

Aquatics
Anastasiya Kirpichnikova (born 2000), Russian swimmer
Anastasiya Korolyova (born 1983), Uzbekistani swimmer
Anastasiya Krapyvina (born 1994), Russian swimmer
Anastasiya Malyavina (born 1997), Ukrainian swimmer
Anastasiya Savchuk (born 1996), Ukrainian synchronised swimmer
Anastasiya Tyurina (born 2001), Tajikistani swimmer
Anastasiya Yermakova (born 1983), Russian synchronised swimmer

Cross sports
Anastasiya Chernenko (born 1990), Ukrainian triathlete
Anastasiya Polyanskaya (born 1986), Ukrainian triathlete
Anastasiya Prokopenko (born 1985), Belarusian modern pentathlete
Anastasiya Spas (born 1993), Ukrainian modern pentathlete

Handball
Anastasiya Mazgo (born 1995), Belarusian handballer
Anastasiya Pidpalova (born 1982), Ukrainian handballer

Football
Anastasiya Akimova (born 1991), Russian football defender
Anastasiya Kharlanova (born 1992), Belarusian football forward
Anastasiya Kunitskaya (born 1989), Belarusian football defender

Gymnastics
Anastasiya Alistratava (born 2003), Belorussian artistic gymnast
Anastasiya Kisse (born 1995), Ukrainian rhythmic gymnast
Anastasiya Kolesnikova (born 1984), Russian artistic gymnast
Anastasiya Miroshnichenko (born 2004), Uzbekistani artistic gymnast
Anastasiya Muntyanu (born 1994), Canadian rhythmic gymnast
Anastasiya Prasolova (born 1989), Azerbaijani rhythmic gymnast
Anastasiya Serdyukova (born 1997), Uzbekistani rhythmic gymnast
Anastasiya Voznyak (born 1998), Ukrainian rhythmic gymnast

Nordic sports
Anastasiya Barannikova (born 1987), Russian ski jumper
Anastasiya Kuzmina (born 1984), Slovak biathlete
Anastasiya Merkushyna (born 1995), Ukrainian biathlete
Anastasiya Novosad (born 1993), Ukrainian freestyle skier
Anastasiya Nychyporenko (born 1995), Moldovan biathlete
Anastasiya Skryabina (born 1985), Ukrainian alpine skier

Racquet sports
Anastasiya Cherniavskaya (born 1992), Belarusian badminton player
Anastasiya Danchenko (born 1990), Russian badminton player
Anastasiya Dmytryshyn (born 1995), Ukrainian badminton player
Anastasiya Komardina (born 1997), Russian tennis player
Anastasiya Prenko (born 1993), Turkmenistan tennis player
Anastasiya Shoshyna (born 1997), Ukrainian tennis player
Anastasiya Vasylyeva (born 1992), Ukrainian tennis player
Anastasiya Yakimova (born 1986), Belarusian tennis player

Water sports
Anastasiya Horlova, Ukrainian canoeist
Anastasiya Kozhenkova (born 1986), Ukrainian rower

Weightlifting
Anastasiya Lysenko (born 1995), Ukrainian weightlifter 
Anastasiya Mikhalenka (born 1995), Belarusian weightlifter

Volleyball
Anastasiya Gurbanova (born 1989), Azerbaijani volleyball player
Anastasiya Harelik (born 1991), Belarusian volleyball player
Anastasiya Kodirova (born 1979), Russian volleyball player

Other
Anastasiya Dzedzikava (born 1997), Belarusian cyclist
Anastasiya Huchok, Belarusian wrestler
Anastasiya Ovsyannikova (born 1988), Russian Paralympian
Anastasiya Verameyenka (born 1987), Belarusian basketball player

Chess
Anastasiya Karlovich (born 1982), Ukrainian chess player
Anastasiya Rakhmangulova (born 1994), Ukrainian chess player
Anastasya Paramzina (born 1998), Russian chess player

Music
Anastasiya Bespalova, Russian composer
Anastasiya Oleksiyivna Kamenskykh (born 1987), known as NK (Ukrainian singer)
Anastasiya Petryk (born 2002), Ukrainian singer
Anastasiya Petryshak (born 1994), Ukrainian violinist
Anastasiya Usova (born 1988), Kazakhstani singer

Royalty
Anastasiya Dabizha (died 1703), Romanian princess
Anastasija Trubetskaya (1700-1755), Russian/Romanian princess

Theatrics
Anastasiya Nemolyaeva (born 1969), Russian actress
Anastasiya Verbitskaya (1861 – 1928), Russian writer
Anastasiya Vertinskaya (born 1944), Russian actress

Other
Anastasiya Biseniek (1899 – 1943), Russian resistance member
Anastasiya Kobzarenko (born 1934), Ukrainian librarian and writer
Anastasiya Markovich (born 1979), Ukrainian painter
 Anastasiya Meshcheryakova (died 2016), Russian homicide victim
Anastasiya Novikova (1980 - 2004), Kazakhstani journalist
Anastasiya Sienina (born 1991), Ukrainian beauty pageant titleholder

See also 

Anastacia (given name)
Anastasia
Anastasiia
Anastasija
Annastasia
Anastassya Kudinova

Feminine given names